Pyabelo Chaold Kouly (Pyabèlo Bernadette Chaold Kouli) is a Togolese author. 

Born in 1943 in Pagouda, Togo, she subsequently migrated to Germany in 1961 to study as a laboratory assistant. She is one of the few female Togolese writers to be published.

Selected works 
 Souvenirs de douze années passées en République Fédérale d'Allemagne (Memories of Twelve Years Spent in Germany) 1975, published 1978.
 Brief von einer Togolesin an ihre Bekannten und Freunde in Deutschland.
 Le Caneton égaré. Lomé: Les Nouvelles Editions Africaines.  OCLC 36933011
 Enfants à la ferme de Lama-Tessi
 Fala, le redoutable. Lomé: Les Nouvelles Editions Africaines.  OCLC 36933041
 Le Missionnaire de Pessaré Kouloum Lomé: Les Nouvelles Editions Africaines, 1979. OCLC 81289042
 Recitations.  Lomé : Nouvelles Editions africaines du Togo, 1991. OCLC 36755134
 Djidili et Wédé à la ferme de Lama-Tessi au Togo, 1994?  OCLC 35665101

References

Sources
 Pyabelo Chaold Kouly, Reading Women Writers and African Literatures, University of Western Australia.
 Ayodélé Mané Aguiar. Chaold Pyabelo, écrivain à fleur de peau Amina 208 (septembre 1987), pp. 65–66. Interview
 Littérature féminine francophone d'Afrique noire By Pierrette Herzberger-Fofana, . pp 528–530.
 Révélations sur Mme CHAOLD, Togo-Contact magazine (undated)
 OCLC Linked Authority File

1943 births
Living people
20th-century women writers
Togolese women writers
People from Kara Region
20th-century Togolese women writers
20th-century Togolese writers
21st-century Togolese women writers
21st-century Togolese writers